Chandrani Pearls is a pearl jewellery brand of India. Its headquarters is at Kolkata in West Bengal.

History
Chandrani Pearls was started on 24 January 1985 by Kuldip Nayar, his wife Lakshmi and his father N.C. Nayar in Kolkata’s up market Minto Park area. Chandrani Pearls imports pearls from Japan, China or Korea.

References

External links
 

Indian companies established in 1985
Organisations based in Kolkata
1985 establishments in West Bengal
Retail companies established in 1985